Rascal is an experimental domain specific language for metaprogramming, such as static code analysis, program transformation, program generation and implementation of domain specific languages. It is a general meta language in the sense that it does not have a bias for any particular software language. It includes primitives from relational calculus and term rewriting. Its syntax and semantics are based on procedural (imperative) and functional programming.

See also 
 ASF+SDF
 Stratego/XT
 DMS Software Reengineering Toolkit
 ANTLR
 Source-to-source compiler

References

External links 
 http://www.rascal-mpl.org

Term-rewriting programming languages
Extensible syntax programming languages
Programming language implementation
Transformation languages
Language workbench